In the women's 2020–21 Biathlon World Cup total score, for each participating athlete the points earned in all Individual, Sprint, Pursuit and Mass start competitions held during the season are added up with the two lowest scores subtracted at the end of the season to give that athlete's final score. This includes the results from the Biathlon World Championships 2021 (held between the World Cup stages in Antholz-Anterselva and Nové Město).

2019–20 Top 3 standings

Events summary

Standings 

In each event places 1 to 40 (1 to 30 in a Mass start) are awarded points, a victory being worth 60 points. The full point system is shown in the table on the right. In a Mass start event only 30 athletes are allowed to participate and the points awarded for ranks 22 to 30 differ from the system used in other events. Equal placings (ties) give an equal number of points. An athlete's total World Cup Score is the sum of all World Cup points earned in the season, minus the points from 2 events in which the athlete got their worst scores. Ties in this score are broken by comparing the tied athletes' number of victories. If this number is the same for the athletes in question, the number of second places is compared, and so on. If a tie cannot be broken by this procedure, it remains a tie.

22 of 26 competitions scored

References 

Overall Women